Acacia quornensis, commonly known as Quorn wattle, is a shrub belonging to the genus Acacia and the subgenus Phyllodineae native to southern Australia.

Description
It has dark reddish brown glabrous branchlets and green narrowly elliptic to oblanceolate shaped pale green phyllodes. It flowers between September and November producing racemose inflorescences have spherical flower-heads containing 8 to 15 loosely packed light golden flowers.

Taxonomy
It belongs to the Acacia microbotrya group of Acacias and is quite closely related to Acacia wattsiana. The specific epithet refers to the place where the type specimen was collected, a hill near Quorn.

Distribution
It is endemic to a small area in the Flinders Range of South Australia from Quorn to Hawker where it is found on the lower slopes of the range and in rocky gullies growing in calcareous loamy soils as a part of low woodland communities dominated by Callitris glaucophylla. It is locally common but considered rare in South Australia.

See also
 List of Acacia species

References

quornensis
Flora of South Australia
Plants described in 1949
Taxa named by John McConnell Black